This is a list of the Austrian Singles Chart number-one hits of 2001.

See also
2001 in music

References

2001 in Austria
Austria
2001